The Herreshoff H-26 is an American sailboat that was designed by Gordon Goodwin, Sidney Herreshoff and Halsey Chase Herreshoff as a cruiser.

The H-26 is a cruising development of the 1914 Herreshoff H-12 1/2 and is an enlarged version of the 1959 Goldeneye, both Nathaniel G. Herreshoff designs.

Production
The design was built by Cape Cod Shipbuilding in the United States, but it is now out of production. The company indicates that it still has the molds and would consider putting the design back into production, if a sufficient number were ordered.

Design
The Herreshoff H-26 is a recreational keelboat, built predominantly of fiberglass, with teak wood trim. It has a masthead sloop rig with aluminum spars, a spooned plumb stem, a raised transom, a keel-mounted rudder controlled by either a wheel or a tiller and a fixed long keel. It displaces  and carries  of lead ballast.

There is also a  holding tank.

The boat's galley is located on both sides of the cabin and includes a two-burner alcohol stove. The head is a marine toilet located forward, just aft of the bow "V"-berth. Additional sleeping space is provided by the dinette settee, for a total sleeping accommodation for four people. The dinette has an optional folding table. Ventilation is provided by a forward hatch, while the eight cabin ports are fixed.

The boat has a large cockpit with two genoa winches and two winches for the halyards. It is fitted with jiffy reefing. Optional equipment includes jib roller furling, self tailing winches, a stern-mounted ladder and shore power connections.

See also
List of sailing boat types

Similar sailboats
Beneteau First 26
C&C 26
C&C 26 Wave
Contessa 26
Dawson 26
Discovery 7.9
Grampian 26
Hunter 26
Hunter 26.5
Hunter 260
Hunter 270
Mirage 26
Nash 26
Nonsuch 26
Outlaw 26
Paceship PY 26
Pearson 26
Parker Dawson 26
Sandstream 26
Tanzer 26

References

External links
Official website

Keelboats
Sailing yachts
Sailboat types built by Cape Cod Shipbuilding
Sailboat type designs by Halsey Herreshoff